Necmettin Karaduman (1927, Trabzon – 22 June 2017, Istanbul) was a Turkish politician, who was the Speaker of the Grand National Assembly of Turkey.

References

1927 births
2017 deaths
People from Trabzon
Motherland Party (Turkey) politicians
Speakers of the Parliament of Turkey